Glenna Laureen Wright-Gallo is an American educator who is the nominee to serve as assistant secretary of education for special education and rehabilitative services in the Biden administration.

Education 
Gallo earned a Bachelor of Science in special education and teaching from the University of Nevada, Las Vegas, a Master of Science and special education and teaching from Utah State University, and a Master of Business Administration from Western Governors University.

Career 
From 1997 to 2005, Gallo worked as a special education teacher in the Jordan School District. She joined the Utah State Board of Education in 2005, serving as an education specialist until 2008 and state/federal compliance officer from 2008 to 2010. From 2010 to 2017, she served as Utah director of special education.

Since 2017, she has served as assistant superintendent in the Washington State Office of Superintendent of Public Instruction. As assistant superintendent, Gallo has appeared frequently as a special education specialist on NPR.

Nomination to Department of Education
On November 12, 2021, President Joe Biden nominated Gallo to be an assistant secretary of education. Her nomination was sent to the Senate on December 2, 2021. Gallo's nomination was favorably reported by the United States Senate Committee on Health, Education, Labor and Pensions on February 10, 2022. Her nomination is currently pending before the full Senate.

References 

Living people
American educators
Special educators
University of Nevada, Las Vegas alumni
Utah State University alumni
Western Governors University alumni
Educators from Utah
Educators from Washington (state)
Year of birth missing (living people)